The Church of St. Mary and All Saints, Willoughby-on-the-Wolds is a parish church in the Church of England in Willoughby on the Wolds, Nottinghamshire, England.

History

The church, dedicated to St Mary, is medieval and has many ancient and splendid monuments of the Willoughbys, ancestors of Lord Middleton, whose predecessors sold this lordship many years ago to various proprietors."

Parish status
The church is in a cluster comprising:
St. Peter and St. Paul's Church, Widmerpool 
Church of St. Mary and All Saints, Willoughby-on-the-Wolds
Holy Trinity Church, Wysall

Organ
The church has a pipe organ by E. Wragg & Son. A specification of the pipe organ can be found on the National Pipe Organ Register.

References

Church of England church buildings in Nottinghamshire
Willoughby-on-the-Wolds